is a railway station in the city of Uozu, Toyama, Japan, operated by the private railway operator Toyama Chihō Railway.

Lines

Station layout 
The station has one elevated side platform serving a single bi-directional track, with the station building located underneath. The station is staffed.

History
Dentetsu-Uozu Station was opened on 5 June 1936.

Adjacent stations

Passenger statistics
In fiscal 2015, the station was used by 824 passengers daily.

Surrounding area 
Uozu Buried Forest Museum

See also
 List of railway stations in Japan

References

External links

 

Railway stations in Toyama Prefecture
Railway stations in Japan opened in 1936
Stations of Toyama Chihō Railway
Uozu, Toyama